The relationship between Rudolf Steiner and the Theosophical Society, co-founded in 1875 by H.P. Blavatsky with Henry Steel Olcott and others, was a complex and changing one. Rudolf Steiner founded the Anthroposophical Society on 28 December 1912, and he was expelled from the Theosophical Society on 7 March 1913.

In 1899, Steiner published an article in the Magazin für Literatur, titled "Goethe's Secret Revelation", on the esoteric nature of Goethe's fairy tale, The Green Snake and the Beautiful Lily. This article led to an invitation by the Count and Countess Brockdorff to speak to a gathering of Theosophists on the subject of Friedrich Nietzsche.  This invitation was followed by a second, the occasion of what he later considered to be his first fully 'esoteric' lecture, once again on the topic of Goethe's fairy tale. 

Steiner continued speaking regularly to the members of the Theosophical Society, becoming the head of its newly constituted German section in 1902. The German Section of the Theosophical Society grew rapidly under Steiner's leadership as he lectured throughout much of Europe on his spiritual science. Through his lecturing to Theosophists, Steiner met Marie von Sievers, owner of the Theosophical headquarters in Berlin, who was to become his spiritual partner and second wife.  From the end of 1903 Steiner and von Sievers became the inseparable centre of Berlin Theosophy. 

By 1904, Steiner was appointed by Annie Besant to be leader of an Esoteric School for Germany and Austria. Steiner made it clear that this school would teach a Western spiritual path harmonious with, but differing fundamentally in approach from, other Theosophical paths. These and other differences with Besant became particularly pronounced at the Theosophical Congress in Munich in 1907—organized by Steiner—its focus on artistic expression was a sharp departure from the Blavatsky tradition. 

{{Quotation|Into the programme of the [Theosophical Congress of 1907] was introduced an artistic representation. Marie von Sievers translation of... Schuré's Eleusinian drama... [provided] an artistic element directed towards the purpose of not leaving the spiritual life henceforth void of art within the Society. 

A great portion of the old members of the Theosophical Society from England, France, and especially from the Netherlands, were inwardly displeased by the innovations offered them at the Munich congress. What it would have been well to understand, but what was clearly grasped at that time by exceedingly few, was the fact that the anthroposophic current had given something of an entirely different bearing from that of the Theosophical Society up to that time. IN THIS INNER BEARING LAY THE TRUE REASON WHY THE ANTHROPOSOPHICAL SOCIETY COULD NO LONGER EXIST AS A PART OF THE THEOSOPHICAL SOCIETY.|Rudolf Steiner, Chapter XXXVIII, The Story of My Life, 1928}}

Steiner's lecture cycles from 1909 onwards emphasized his research into Christianity, toward which Mme. Blavatsky had been notably hostile. Thus, the tensions grew between the main society and the German section. The relationship between the Theosophical Society centered in Adyar, India and its German section became increasingly strained as the new strains of Steiner's teaching became apparent. 

Steiner's popularity as a lecturer spread far beyond the borders of Germany: he was active in Switzerland, the Netherlands, Norway, Austria and other countries. Besant tried to restrict him to lecturing in Germany itself, but this contravened both Theosophical Society statutes as well as a statement of Besant's greeting this broadening lecture activity, issued some months before. These tensions finally came to a head over the question of Jiddu Krishnamurti, a young Indian boy to whom C. W. Leadbeater, followed by Annie Besant, attributed messianic status as the new World Teacher, an incarnation of the Lord Maitreya. Steiner quickly denied this attribution of messianic status to Krishnamurti, claiming that Christ's earthly incarnation in Jesus was a unique event. Steiner held that though the human being generally goes through a series of repeated earth lives, the spiritual being Christ incarnated only once in a physical body. Christ, he said, would reappear in "the etheric" — the realm that lives between people and in community life — not as a physical individual. Steiner and the majority of the German-speaking Theosophists broke away to found a new group, the Anthroposophical Society, at the end of 1912. Shortly thereafter, Besant revoked the German section's membership in the Theosophical Society on the grounds of the section's refusal to allow admission to adherents of a Theosophical organization established to support the mission of Krishnamurti, the Order of the Star in the East. Anthroposophists were offended when Besant falsely claimed that Steiner had been educated by Jesuits.

The World Teacher concept was unpopular with many theosophists, and was repudiated by Krishnamurti himself in 1929, leading to a crisis in the Theosophical Society. It was, however, a basic principle of the Theosophical Society that adherents of all religions were admitted. 

As a result of the conflict, two steps followed in rapid succession:
The overwhelming majority of German-speaking theosophists followed Steiner into the new Anthroposophical Society, founded between August and December 1912.  In a telegram sent to the Theosophical Society they justified this step by stating it was: "based upon the recognition that the President [Besant] has continually and even systematically violated this highest principle of the Theosophical Society, 'No religion higher than the truth', and has abused the presidential power in arbitrary ways, thus hindering positive work."
Steiner's exclusion of Star in the East followers was a direct contravention of Theosophical Society statutes, and duly led to the charter of the German Section being revoked.

Steiner later claimed that he never had considered himself to be part of the Theosophical movement.Already in 1897, well before the above-mentioned contacts, Steiner had clearly articulated his objections to the movement, criticizing it for "empty phrases" borrowed from Oriental texts and "inner experiences that are nothing but hypocrisy". One of his chief objections was that the Theosophists elevated the East's path to truth to the only possible one, thereby discounting modern science's approach to truth through reason and logic. See Rudolf Steiner, "Theosophen (Theosophists)", Magazin für Literatur, 1897, Nr. 35, reprinted in GA 32: Rudolf Steiner, Gesammelte Aufsätze zur Literatur 1884-1902, Rudolf Steiner Verlag, 2004, p. 194-196. Even while the leader of the German section of the movement, he made a great point of his complete independence of philosophical thought and esoteric teachings from the Theosophical Society's esoteric path. His reaction to the above events was: "I myself experience what has happened — apart from what has been sobering and painful — as a great liberation from the oppressive narrowness that has characterized the life of the Theosophical Society for years."

The basic structural skeletons of Steiner's cosmology and of his description of the human being as composed of various physical and spiritual aspects are based on Blavatsky's schema, to whom he acknowledged his debt.Rudolf Steiner, Theosophy: An introduction to the spiritual processes in human life and in the cosmos, Steiner Books, 1994,  Steiner's elaborations of these (in his Theosophy and Outline of Esoteric Science'') diverge from other theosophical presentations both in style and in substance, however. Despite their differences and the split with the Theosophical Society, Rudolf Steiner maintained a keen watch on the Theosophy Society throughout his life and continued to acquire Theosophical publications; of the hundreds of books in English in Rudolf Steiner's library, half were Theosophical books.

References

Rudolf Steiner
Anthroposophy
Theosophical Society